Blackwells may refer to:

 Blackwell UK, also known as Blackwell's, a chain of bookshops, online retail, mail order and library supply services in the United Kingdom
 Blackwell Publishing, now part of Wiley-Blackwell
 Blackwells, Georgia
 Blackwells, Virginia
 Blackwells Corner, California
 Blackwells Mills, New Jersey
 Blackwells Mills Canal House, in Blackwells Mill, New Jersey

See also 
 Blackwell (disambiguation)